Zachary Booth (born 1983) is an American actor. He appeared in several productions with the Peterborough Players in Peterborough, New Hampshire, before starring in The N's What Goes On and on FX's Damages. Booth is a 2004 BFA graduate of the University of Michigan.

Career
Booth had supporting roles in the films Assassination of a High School President alongside Mischa Barton, and The Marc Pease Experience with Ben Stiller. In 2009 he had a role in the Ang Lee film Taking Woodstock as a member of a hippie naturist group.

In fall/winter of 2008 Booth co-starred alongside Tony award winners Victoria Clark and Michelle Park and Tony nominee Jonathan Groff in Prayer for My Enemy, a new play by Craig Lucas at the Off-Broadway theater Playwrights Horizons in New York City. During the same year, he played the role of Gary in Nick and Norah's Infinite Playlist.

In September 2010 he starred in the New York production of the new Edward Albee play Me, Myself & I also at Playwrights Horizons.

He played a lead role in Ira Sachs' Keep the Lights On. The film opened on September 7, 2012.

From 2018 to 2021, Booth played Horace Gilmer in To Kill a Mockingbird at the Shubert Theatre on Broadway.

Filmography

Film

Television

Personal life 
Booth is gay. "As an actor who has been embraced by the queer community, I can't hide who I am, my truth, and still benefit from that. It feels uncomfortable", he said in an interview to Logo.

References

External links

Living people
1983 births
Date of birth missing (living people)
Place of birth missing (living people)
American male television actors
American male film actors
American male stage actors
American gay actors
21st-century American male actors
University of Michigan alumni